The Scotland national football team represents Scotland in international association football and is controlled by the Scottish Football Association. It is the joint-oldest national football team in the world, alongside England, Scotland's opponents in what is now recognised as the world's first international football match, which took place at Hamilton Crescent in Glasgow in November 1872. Prior to this, a series of matches had been played between teams representing the two countries, but the Scottish team was drawn almost entirely from players based in and around London and these games are now not regarded as full international matches. The lack of involvement by players from Scottish clubs in these matches led to some controversy, which was resolved when The Football Association arranged to send a team to play in Glasgow, where the English players took on a Scotland team composed entirely of players from the Queen's Park club.

Between 1872 and 1914, when competitive football was interrupted by the First World War, Scotland played 113 international matches, resulting in 70 victories, 23 draws and 20 defeats. This total does not include a match in 1902 which was declared void after a disaster at Ibrox Park in which 25 spectators died.  Scotland played an annual friendly against England each year until 1883, and added a regular game against Wales in 1876. These two teams remained Scotland's only opponents until the British Home Championship was instituted in 1884, consisting of a round-robin tournament between England, Scotland, Wales and Ireland. Of the 31 tournaments staged prior to the war, Scotland won 10 outright and 6 jointly. Scotland's 11–0 defeat of Ireland in 1901 is the national team's biggest win, and the 6–1 victory over England at Kennington Oval in 1881 remains the team's biggest win away to fierce rivals England. Scotland's games with England during this period drew extremely large crowds, with five matches prior to the First World War attracting crowds of over 100,000 spectators. The compilers of the World Football Elo Ratings retrospectively consider Scotland to have been ranked at number 1 during much of the early period of international football.

Key

Key to matches
Att. = Match attendance
(H) = Home ground
(A) = Away ground

Key to record by opponent
P = Games played
W = Games won
D = Games drawn
L = Games lost
GF = Goals for
GA = Goals against

Results
Scotland's score is shown first in each case.

Notes
A.  This match replaced the original England–Scotland game, played at the new Ibrox Park on 5 April, which was declared void after a disaster in which 25 spectators died.

Record by opponent

British Home Championship record by season

References

External links
Scottish FA: National Team Archive

1870s in Scotland
1880s in Scotland
1890s in Scotland
1900s in Scotland
1910s in Scotland
1800s-1900s
1872–73 in Scottish football
1873–74 in Scottish football
1874–75 in Scottish football
1875–76 in Scottish football
1876–77 in Scottish football
1877–78 in Scottish football
1878–79 in Scottish football
1879–80 in Scottish football
1880–81 in Scottish football
1881–82 in Scottish football
1882–83 in Scottish football
1883–84 in Scottish football
1884–85 in Scottish football
1885–86 in Scottish football
1886–87 in Scottish football
1887–88 in Scottish football
1888–89 in Scottish football
1889–90 in Scottish football
1890–91 in Scottish football
1891–92 in Scottish football
1892–93 in Scottish football
1893–94 in Scottish football
1894–95 in Scottish football
1895–96 in Scottish football
1896–97 in Scottish football
1897–98 in Scottish football
1898–99 in Scottish football
1899–1900 in Scottish football
1900–01 in Scottish football
1901–02 in Scottish football
1902–03 in Scottish football
1903–04 in Scottish football
1904–05 in Scottish football
1905–06 in Scottish football
1906–07 in Scottish football
1907–08 in Scottish football
1908–09 in Scottish football
1909–10 in Scottish football
1910–11 in Scottish football
1911–12 in Scottish football
1912–13 in Scottish football
1913–14 in Scottish football